IMSA Prototype Challenge (formerly IMSA Prototype Lites) was a racing series featuring two classes of single-seat prototype cars racing simultaneously. The series was sanctioned by the International Motor Sports Association (IMSA). Most races were held in support of the WeatherTech SportsCar Championship. The series raced LMP3 class prototype sportscars. The cars have grown in size and speed since its 2006 introduction, starting from four-cylinder and motorcycle powered race cars to large V8 powered cars. Each race was 1 hour and 45 minutes long apart from the season opening 3 hour race at Daytona International Speedway. 

The series' final season was in 2022. For 2023, the series was replaced with the IMSA VP Racing SportsCar Challenge.

Car Specifications

LMP3 Class

Former classes

MPC Class
Engine: 2.0-liter, Naturally aspirated Mazda MZR engine
Gearbox: 6 Speed Sequential Manual Transmission
Weight: 1,425 lb (646 kg) with driver
Fuel Delivery: Electronic fuel injection

L2 Class
Engine: 2.3-liter, Naturally aspirated Mazda MP2
Gearbox: 6 Speed Sequential Manual Transmission
Weight: 1,425 lb (646 kg) with driver
Fuel Delivery: Electronic fuel injection

L2 Class 2006-2012 only
Engine: 1000cc Naturally aspirated Kawasaki or Suzuki
Weight: 1,100 lb (500 kg) with driver

L3 Class 2006-2009 only, class discontinued for 2010 
Engine: 2.3-liter, Naturally aspirated Mazda MZR
Weight: 1,350 lb (612 kg) with driver

Champions

References

External links 
 Official site

 
Auto racing series in Canada
Auto racing series in the United States
International Motor Sports Association
Sports car racing series
Organizations disestablished in 2022
Defunct auto racing series